Tephritis pelia is a species of tephritid or fruit flies in the genus Tephritis of the family Tephritidae.

Distribution
Australia.

References

Tephritinae
Insects described in 1868
Diptera of Australasia